Séïbou Mama (born 28 December 1995) is a Beninese professional footballer who plays as a midfielder for French club Vannes and the Benin national team.

International career
At the youth level he played in the 2013 African U-20 Championship. He represented the senior national team at the 2019 Africa Cup of Nations, where the team reached the quarter-finals.

Career statistics

International

Scores and results list Benin's goal tally first, score column indicates score after each Mama goal.

References

External links
 
 

1995 births
Living people
People from Parakou
Beninese footballers
Association football midfielders
Benin international footballers
Benin under-20 international footballers
2019 Africa Cup of Nations players
USS Kraké players
ASPAC FC players
Buffles du Borgou FC players
SC Toulon players
Vannes OC players
Benin Premier League players
Championnat National players
Championnat National 2 players
Beninese expatriate footballers
Beninese expatriate sportspeople in France
Expatriate footballers in France